Mountcastle & Sons is an Australian hat manufacturer. The company is associated with bush hats made of rabbit fur felt with wide brims that are worn in rural Australia.

Statesman Hats is owned by Mountcastle Statesman was established in 1972 in Western Australia. It was bought by Mountcastle in 1995.

Trutex, an independent school uniform brand, is owned by Mountcastle.

See also

List of oldest companies in Australia

References

External links

1835 establishments in Australia
Australian companies established in 1835
Retail companies established in 1835
Companies based in Melbourne
Retail companies of Australia
Family-owned companies of Australia
Hat companies
Companies based in New South Wales
Outdoor clothing brands
Rider apparel
Australian headgear
Australian fashion
Clothing brands of Australia
Privately held companies of Australia
Australian military uniforms
School uniform